Ascensor is a 1978 short Spanish film directed by Tomás Muñoz. It was entered into the 28th Berlin International Film Festival, where it won the Golden Bear.

Plot
A group of four strangers are stranded together in an elevator.

Cast
 Armando Aguirre
 Antonio Lara
 Miguel Moncho
 Maria Luisa Oliveda
 Juan Subatella

References

External links

1978 films
1978 short films
1970s Spanish-language films
Spanish short films
Golden Bear winners
1970s Spanish films